The 1964 season was the Minnesota Vikings' fourth in the National Football League. Under head coach Norm Van Brocklin, the team finished with an 8–5–1 record for their first winning season and a franchise-best until 1969. They tied with the Green Bay Packers for second place in the Western conference, who gained the berth in the third-place Playoff Bowl in Miami on January 3. The two teams had split their season series, with the road teams winning, but the Packers won the tiebreaker on point differential: the Vikings' victory was by just one point, while Green Bay won by over four touchdowns. In the season opener, the Vikings upset eventual Western champion Baltimore.

To date, this is the only season the Vikings wore white jerseys for all their home games. In January 1964, the NFL owners had approved a new rule which allowed home teams to wear the jersey color of their choice.

This was the first season for the forty-man roster, an increase of three.

Offseason

1964 Draft

 The Vikings traded their fourth-round selection (47th overall) to the Chicago Bears in exchange for RB Bill Brown.
 The Vikings traded RB Hugh McElhenny to the New York Giants in exchange for the Giants' fourth-round selection (53rd overall) and 1965 second-round selection (15th overall).
 The Vikings traded their 10th-round selection (131st overall) to the Los Angeles Rams in exchange for RB Tommy Wilson.

Roster

Preseason

Regular season

Schedule

 ^ Opening day attendance record at Metropolitan Stadium
 * Single game attendance record at Metropolitan Stadium

Game summaries

Week 7: vs. San Francisco 49ers
The Vikings defeated the 49ers 27–22 on October 25 in San Francisco at Kezar Stadium, but not before defensive end Jim Marshall made one of the most embarrassing errors in NFL history. In the fourth quarter, 49er halfback Billy Kilmer caught a pass from rookie quarterback George Mira and fumbled the ball forward, which was scooped up in stride by Marshall. He unknowingly ran 66 yards with it the wrong way into his own end zone; thinking he scored a touchdown, he tossed the ball in the air throwing it out of bounds, resulting in a safety. The Vikings had a 27–17 lead at the time, and it narrowed the gap to eight points.

On the previous possession, Marshall had forced a Mira fumble in the collapsing pocket and defensive end Carl Eller had scooped up the loose ball and ran it back 45 yards for a touchdown. Just before that, Viking linebacker Roy Winston had intercepted a Mira pass early in the fourth quarter and returned it to the 49er eleven-yard line, setting up a touchdown run by quarterback Fran Tarkenton to take the lead.  Two weeks later in Minnesota, the Vikings defeated the 49ers again, by a score of 24–7.

YouTube – NFL Films – Jim Marshall's Wrong Way Run

Standings

Statistics

Team leaders

League rankings

References

Minnesota Vikings seasons
Minnesota
Minnesota Vikings